Keg River is an unincorporated community in northern Alberta, Canada. It is west of Highway 35 (also known as the Mackenzie Highway) approximately midway between Manning to the south and High Level to the north.

The community is located in census division No. 17 and in the federal riding of Peace River. It is administered by the County of Northern Lights.

Climate

See also 
List of communities in Alberta

References 

Localities in the County of Northern Lights